Lwensinga is a town in the Buganda Region of Uganda.

Location
The town is in Mbiriizi Parish, in Lwengo sub-county, Lwengo District. The geographical coordinates of Lwensinga are: 0°23'31.0"S, 31°27'35.0"E (Latitude:-0.391944; Longitude:31.459722).

Overview
Lwensinga is the southern terminus of the  Sembabule–Mateete–Lwensinga Road. Here, this road joins the Masaka–Mbarara Road, which passes through the town, in a general east to west direction. Finance Trust Bank, a commercial bank with headquarters in Kampala, maintains a branch in Lwensinga. The town is also home to Kyamaganda Health Centre II, owned and administered by the Uganda Catholic Medical Bureau.

See also
List of cities and towns in Uganda

References

External links
Lwengo District Sub-Counties 2009

Populated places in Central Region, Uganda
Cities in the Great Rift Valley
Lwengo District